Maukala is a city in Merta Taluk, Nagaur District of the State of Rajasthan in India embellished with temples and palaces. It is also referred to as Mokala or Myokal in some texts. Merta City is bounded by Mokala in the west. Ajmer and Jodhpur are easily accessible from Mokala via roadways. The nearest airport is at Jodhpur. The prime attractions include Meera Bai Temples, Pushkar and palaces in the region.

History
It was a Strong Princely Thikana of Chauhan Rajputs in British India and had the famous town Makrana of world's most renowned white marble from which The Taj Mahal was built. Joseph Rudyard Kipling, who was an English short-story writer, poet, novelist and a Nobel Prize Winner for Literature in 1907, wrote in his works about Myokal or Maukala.

The Chauhan Rulers of Maukala
 Thakur Sahib Shri Bagh Singh Ji, married daughter of Thakur Sahib of Pachranda Thikana of Jodhpur and had issue, 4 sons and 2 daughters.
 Kunwar Zabar Singh, married daughter of Thakur Sahib of Thikana Babra
 Kunwar Mohan Singh, married daughter of Thakur Sahib of Thikana Badi-Khatu
 Kumari Baiji Lal Sajjan Kanwar Sahiba, married son of Thakur Sahib of Abhaypura Jiliya
 Kunwar Girdhari Singh, married daughter of Thakur Sahib of Thikana Palas (Jodhpur)
 Kunwar Kishan Singh, married daughter of Thakur Sahib of Borunda Thikana
 Kumari Baiji Lal Munni Kanwar Sahiba, married son of Thakur Sahib of Kalwar Thikana

See also 
 Thikana
 Chauhan
Makrana
 Tazimi Naresh
Abhaypura Jiliya
Jadawata

References 

Nagaur district